
Frederick Franklin Stephan (May 17, 1903 – August 3, 1971) was an American statistician and sociologist, mainly known for his contributions to survey sampling procedures.

Education and career
Born in Chicago, he received his B.A. from the University of Illinois in 1924 and an M.A. in sociology from the University of Chicago in 1926. He taught at the University of Pittsburgh and at Cornell University, before he moved to Princeton University in 1947, where he was Professor of Social Statistics until his retirement in 1971, shortly before his death.

Together with W. Edwards Deming, he introduced the iterative proportional fitting algorithm to estimate cell probabilities in contingency tables subject to constraints on the margins.

He served as president of AAPOR in 1957–8, and as president of the American Statistical Association in 1966.

Recognition
He was named a Fellow of the American Statistical Association in 1939.

Personal life
John Stephan was his brother.

References 

1903 births
1971 deaths
American statisticians
Fellows of the American Statistical Association
Presidents of the American Statistical Association
University of Illinois alumni
University of Chicago alumni